Asotin  is the county seat of the county of the same name, in the state of Washington, United States. The population of the city was 1,204 at the 2020 census.  It is part of the Lewiston, ID-WA Metropolitan Statistical Area.

History
The name Asotin is derived from a Nez Perce language term meaning "eel creek," founded in 1878 by Alexander Sumpster.  A river ferry stop at Asotin was set up by 1881.

Geography
Asotin is located south of Clarkston, on the west bank of the Snake River.

Climate
This region experiences very warm and dry summers, with no average monthly temperatures above .  According to the Köppen Climate Classification system, Asotin has a warm-summer Mediterranean climate, abbreviated "Csb" on climate maps.

Demographics

2010 census
As of the census of 2010, there were 1,251 people, 500 households, and 352 families residing in the city. The racial makeup of the city was 93.5% White, 1.0% African American, 1.5% Native American, 0.6% Asian, 1.0% Pacific Islander, 0.2% from other races, and 2.2% from two or more races. Hispanic or Latino of any race were 2.2% of the population.

There were 500 households, of which 33.0% had children under the age of 18 living with them, 51.6% were married couples living together, 13.2% had a female householder with no husband present, 5.6% had a male householder with no wife present, and 29.6% were non-families. 24.0% of all households were made up of individuals, and 11.2% had someone living alone who was 65 years of age or older. The average household size was 2.50 and the average family size was 2.93.

The median age in the city was 41 years. 25.3% of residents were under the age of 18; 6.7% were between the ages of 18 and 24; 22.8% were from 25 to 44; 27.8% were from 45 to 64; and 17.6% were 65 years of age or older. The gender makeup of the city was 46.8% male and 53.2% female.

2000 census
As of the census of 2000, there were 1,095 people, 419 households, and 321 families residing in the city. The racial makeup of the city was 97.08% White, 0.18% African American, 1.00% Native American, 0.37% Asian, 0.18% from other races, and 1.19% from two or more races. Hispanic or Latino of any race were 1.55% of the population.

There were 419 households, out of which 38.4% had children under the age of 18 living with them, 53.9% were married couples living together, 18.9% had a female householder with no husband present, and 23.2% were non-families. 19.3% of all households were made up of individuals, and 9.1% had someone living alone who was 65 years of age or older. The average household size was 2.61 and the average family size was 2.96.

In the city, the age distribution of the population shows 29.3% under the age of 18, 6.5% from 18 to 24, 25.4% from 25 to 44, 24.6% from 45 to 64, and 14.2% who were 65 years of age or older. The median age was 39 years. For every 100 females, there were 88.8 males. For every 100 females age 18 and over, there were 81.3 males.

The median income for a household in the city was $35,083, and the median income for a family was $37,115. Males had a median income of $34,844 versus $21,063 for females. The per capita income for the city was $15,257. About 16.4% of families and 19.4% of the population were below the poverty line, including 30.2% of those under age 18 and 6.8% of those age 65 or over.

Notable people
Franklin Lee Baldwin (1913–1987), weird fiction fan and Duane W[eldon] Rimel (1915–1996), author of weird & fantasy tales, as well as crime and 'adult' novels; both corresponded with horror writer H.P. Lovecraft.
Jesse Davis, an offensive tackle for the Miami Dolphins of the NFL.
Kenneth W. Ford (1908–1997), American businessman who established Roseburg Forest Products.
Herbert Niccolls, Jr., 12-year-old convicted murder of the Asotin County Sheriff

References

External links
 Official website

Cities in Asotin County, Washington
Cities in Washington (state)
County seats in Washington (state)
Lewiston–Clarkston metropolitan area
Populated places established in 1878
Washington placenames of Native American origin
1878 establishments in Washington Territory